The Bangladesh women's national cricket team toured Ireland in August 2012. They played in the two Ireland Women's Tri-Series, in ODI and T20I formats, against Ireland and Pakistan. They also separately played Pakistan in 1 ODI and 1 T20I, and against Ireland in 1 ODI. The T20I matches were the first ever played by Bangladesh in the format.

Squads

Only ODI: Bangladesh v Pakistan

Only ODI: Ireland v Bangladesh

Ireland Women's ODI Tri-Series

Fixtures

Only T20I: Bangladesh v Pakistan

Ireland Women's T20 Tri-Series

Fixtures

See also
 2012 Ireland Women's Tri-Series
 Pakistani women's cricket team in England and Ireland in 2012

References

External links
Bangladesh Women tour of Ireland 2012 from Cricinfo

Bangladesh women's national cricket team tours
Women's international cricket tours of Ireland
International cricket competitions in 2012
2012 in women's cricket